Kepler-447b is a confirmed exoplanet. The planet's mass and radius indicate that it is a gas giant with a bulk composition similar to that of Jupiter. Unlike Jupiter, but similar to many planets detected around other stars, Kepler-447b is located very close to its star, and belongs to the class of planets known as hot Jupiters. It has an extremely grazing transit, a property that could be used to detect further properties such as perturbations of the orbit due to other nearby objects or stellar pulsations.

References

External links
 Kepler-447b at NASA's Kepler project
 Kepler-447 b at the Extrasolar Planets Encyclopaedia

Hot Jupiters
Exoplanets discovered in 2015
Transiting exoplanets
Giant planets
447b